Palín is a village and municipality in Michalovce District in the Kosice Region of eastern Slovakia. It is located 15 kilometres from the city of Michalovce.

History
In historical records the village was first mentioned in 1302.

Geography
The village lies at an altitude of 105 metres and covers an area of 11.115 km².
It has a population of about 890 people.

Ethnicity
The population is about 99% Slovak in ethnicity.

Culture
The village has a small public library, a gymnasium and a football pitch.

Gallery

External links

http://www.statistics.sk/mosmis/eng/run.html

Villages and municipalities in Michalovce District